The 2019 season is Persib Bandung's 86th competitive season. The club will compete in Liga 1 and had qualified for the round of 32 in 2018–19 Piala Indonesia following their wins in the first two rounds in 2018.

A season of mixed form saw Persib finish 6th in Liga 1 while the club's cup run ended in the quarter-finals on away goals to Borneo.

Coaching staff

Players

Squad information

Transfers

In

Out

Loan out

Pre-season and friendlies

Indonesia President's Cup

Group A

Friendlies

Competitions

Overview
{| class="wikitable" style="text-align: center"
|-
!rowspan=2|Competition
!colspan=8|Record
!rowspan=2|Started round
!rowspan=2|Final position / round
!rowspan=2|First match	
!rowspan=2|Last match
|-
!
!
!
!
!
!
!
!
|-
| Liga 1

| Matchday 1
| 6th
| 18 May 2019
| 22 December 2019
|-
| Piala Indonesia

| Round of 32
| Quarter-finals
| 27 January 2019
| 4 May 2019
|-
! Total

|colspan=4|''''

Liga 1

League table

Results summary

Results by matchday

Matches

Piala Indonesia

Round of 32

Round of 16

Quarter-finals

Notes

References

Persib Bandung
Persib Bandung seasons